The Saint-Jean River is a major tributary of the north shore of the Gulf of St. Lawrence, flowing in the unorganized territory of Lac-Jérôme and in the municipality of Rivière-Saint-Jean, in the Minganie Regional County Municipality, in the administrative region of Côte-Nord, in the province of Quebec (Canada). It is considered one of the three salmon rivers on the North Shore.

The "Saint John River" gives its name to the municipality of Rivière-Saint-Jean.

This river lives in an outfitter which has two fishing camps at 13th mille and 30th mille.

Location

The mouth of the river is in the municipality of Rivière-Saint-Jean in the Minganie Regional County Municipality.
At its mouth the river is crossed by Quebec Route 138, then flows past the village of Rivière-Saint-Jean.

It lies between the basins of the Magpie River and the Mingan River.
It includes parts of the unorganized territory of Lac-Jérôme and the municipality of Longue-Pointe-de-Mingan.

Geography

According to the Dictionnaire des rivières et lacs de la province de Québec (1914), 

The course of the Saint John River descends from the north, between the Magpie River (located on the west side) and the Manitou River (Québec) (located on the east side).

The Saint John River rises at Lake Kaministukuakamaht, in the unorganized territory of Lac-Jérôme. This lake is fed by seven stream discharges, the main one coming from the west. The mouth of Kaministukuakamaht Lake is located at:
  east of the limit between Labrador and Quebec;
  north-west of the mouth of the Saint John River;
  north-east of downtown Sept-Îles.

Upper Saint-Jean River Course (segment of )

  first towards the northeast to collect the discharge (coming from the north) of a lake; then towards the south-east, crossing on  the lake?, to its mouth;
  first towards the south-east to the outlet (coming from the south) of a group of lakes; then north-east, passing on the west side of Mount Kapiskuapustent, crossing a small lake (altitude: , to its mouth. Note: this lake receives the discharge (coming from the north (west) of a group of lakes;
  towards the south-east, passing on the north-east side of Mount Kapiskuapustent, collecting the discharge (coming from the north) of a set of lakes, forming a loop towards the west, collecting the discharge of a set of lakes, passing on the west side of a small regional airport, collecting the discharge (coming from the east) of Coupeaux Lake, to the confluence of the Labône River (coming from the northwest);

Intermediate course of the Saint-Jean river (upstream of the Labône river) ( segment)

  first towards the south-east in a plain, then towards the south in a deep valley, by collecting the discharge (coming from the west) of a lake, by forming a large curve towards the east at the start of the segment, to a stream (coming from the northwest);
  towards the south in a deep valley, until the confluence of the Rapide River (coming from the northwest). Note: At this confluence, the current bypasses several islands;
  towards the south-east in a deep valley, by collecting the Utnikan stream (coming from the north), until the confluence of the Poisset River (coming from the west);

Intermediate course of the Saint-Jean river (upstream of the Poisset river) (segment of )

  first towards the south-east in a flared valley up to a bend in the river; then south in a deep valley, forming a hook towards the west at the end of the segment, to the outlet (coming from the north) of Lake Élie;
  first towards the south by forming a hook towards the west, then towards the south-east in a deep valley, until the confluence of the Saint John River North-East (coming from the north);

Intermediate course of the Saint-Jean river (upstream of the Saint-Jean North-East river) (segment of )

From the confluence of the Saint-Jean North-East River, the course of the Saint-Jean river descends on:
  generally towards the south-east in a flared valley, forming several large streamers, passing at the start of the segment in front of the hamlet Tshiahahtunekamuk, up to the confluence of the salmon river (coming from West);

Lower St. John River (segment of )

  to the south in a deep valley, forming a loop towards the west at the start of the segment, and another loop towards the east in the mid-segment, up to the stream at Méo (coming from the northeast);
  to the south by forming a large S at the start of the segment and passing in front of the hamlet Kaministnahkuteht (located on the eastern shore), bypassing Little Mantus Island, then forming a loop towards the east at the end of the segment, up to the Chambers river (coming from the west), whose confluence is located opposite the place called Ueht Ka Tshitaikant;
  towards the south by forming a large loop towards the east to bypass the peninsula of the hamlet Kamikuapiskat, by forming a second large loop towards the south-east to collect the discharge from the lake Beaver, then forming another large curve to the north, descending south to pass under the bridge of the route 138, then passing in front of the village of Rivière-Saint-Jean (located on the west bank), collecting the waters of the Sacré-Coeur River, to its mouth. The mouth of the river is partially blocked by Pointe à Robin (located on the west bank) and a peninsula attached to the east bank stretching  to the west. During base tides, the sandstone stretches for about two kilometers at the mouth of the Saint John River, of which about  beyond the pier marking the mouth.

The Saint-Jean river flows on the north shore of the Gulf of St. Lawrence, ie in the Jacques Cartier Strait. This confluence is located at:

  south-west of the village center of Havre-Saint-Pierre;
  north of the western point of Île d'Anticosti;
  north-east of Sept-Îles town center.

Toponymy 
The Innu use the word "Usasumekw", which can be translated into French as "rivière à saumon", to identify the watercourse.

The toponym "Rivière Saint-Jean" was formalized on December 5, 1968, at the Place Names Bank of the Commission de toponymie du Québec.<ref>Commission de toponymie du Québec - rivière Saint-Jean/ref>

Fishing

In May 2015 the Ministry of Forests, Wildlife and Parks of Quebec announced a sport fishing catch-and-release program for large salmon on sixteen of Quebec's 118 salmon rivers.
These were the Mitis, Laval, Pigou, Bouleau, aux Rochers, Jupitagon, Magpie, Saint-Jean, Corneille, Piashti, Watshishou, Little Watshishou, Nabisipi, Aguanish and Natashquan rivers.
The Quebec Atlantic Salmon Federation said that the measures did not go nearly far enough in protecting salmon for future generations.
In view of the rapidly declining Atlantic salmon population catch-and-release should have been implemented on all rivers apart from northern Quebec.

Between 2012 and 2016 the annual average reported catch of salmon was 123 juveniles and 28 large fish, with 412 returned to the water.

See also 
 Louis Babel
 Estuary of Saint Lawrence
 List of rivers of Quebec

Notes and references

Rivers of Côte-Nord
Minganie Regional County Municipality